The 1929 Clemson Tigers football team represented Clemson College—now known as Clemson University—as a member of the Southern Conference (SoCon) during the 1929 college football season. Led by second-year head coach Josh Cody, the Tigers compiled an overall record of 8–3 with a mark of 3–2 in conference play, plaching 12th in the SoCon.

Schedule

References

Clemson
Clemson Tigers football seasons
Clemson Tigers football